Súper Cóndor is a 2015 Peruvian superhero film written and directed by Alejandro Nieto-Polo in his directorial debut. Starring Gerardo Zamora, José Luis Ruiz and Reynaldo Arenas. It is the first superhero movie produced in Peru.

Synopsis 
A corrupt politician is about to take over the country's government. An honest police officer wants to disrupt this network of corruption, but he is alone against the system. Meanwhile, an accountant struggling to support his son gains a special power and soon discovers its purpose: to save everyone.

Cast 
The actors participating in this film are:

 Gerardo Zamora as Pedro 'El Condor'
 Jose Luis Ruiz as Mayor Martínez
 Reynaldo Arenas as Victor
 Antonio Arrué
 Havier Arboleda
 Mayela Lloclla

Release 
The film had a limited theatrical release in Santa Anita on November 27, 2015. It was released commercially on September 16, 2016.

Sequel 
The film had a sequel titled El Cóndor en Nueva York (El Cóndor in New York) and was filmed 90% in the United States. It was released on September 15, 2018, in the USA, and on January 15, 2021, in Peru.

References

External links 

 

2015 films
2010s superhero films
2015 action films
2015 fantasy films
2015 independent films
Peruvian superhero films
Peruvian fantasy films
Peruvian action films
Nima Producciones films
2010s Peruvian films
2010s Spanish-language films
Films set in Peru
Films shot in Peru
Films about politicians
Films about corruption
Films about father–son relationships
2015 directorial debut films